ARLnow is a local online newspaper covering news in Arlington County, Virginia.

Scott Brodbeck started ARLnow in January 2010. ARLnow publishes Morning Notes every day with a roundup of local news and includes a weather report for each day. The site is updated throughout the day.

In 2020, for their coverage of Amazon HQ2, the Washington, D.C. chapter of the Society of Professional Journalists awarded ARLnow journalists with the 2019 Dateline Award for online business reporting.

Related publications
In addition to ARLnow, Local News Now operates other local news sites in Northern Virginia, including ALXnow in Alexandria, Reston Now in Reston, and Tysons Reporter in Tysons.

References

External links

American news websites
Arlington County, Virginia
Newspapers published in Virginia
Publications established in 2010